The Ardcanaght Stones are a pair of ogham stones (CIIC 246) forming a National Monument located in County Kerry, Ireland.

Location

History

The inscriptions are too fragmentary to give them a precise date. Ogham carvings were made in Ireland between the 4th and 10th centuries. They were rediscovered in the 1940s and moved here in recent years from a cillín.

Description

The two stones are accompanied by a large standing stone, 1.6 m (5 ft 3 in) tall.

The stones are:
 246a: 90 cm (3 feet) tall with the inscription LMCBLTCL  LT
 246b: a small fragment with the inscription V MAQỊ. "MAQI" commonly appears on Ogham inscriptions; it means "son [of]".

References

National Monuments in County Kerry
Ogham inscriptions